Dranesville is a  census-designated place (CDP) in Fairfax County, Virginia, United States. Dranesville is located on the Leesburg Pike (State Route 7) at its intersection with Georgetown Pike (State Route 193). The U.S. Census Bureau defines Dranesville as a census-designated place (CDP) with a population of 11,921 as of 2010.

The town is named for James Drane, a settler who moved there from Maryland in 1810 and began the operation of Drane's Tavern. The Dranesville Tavern is listed on the National Register of Historic Places. James was father of noted lobbyist Washington Drane.

Geography
The CDP is located in northern Fairfax County and is bounded by Route 7 to the northeast, the Loudoun County line to the northwest, the town of Herndon to the southwest, and Reston to the southeast. The original settlement of Dranesville, at the intersection of Routes 7 and 193, is at the northeast corner of the CDP.

See also 
Battle of Dranesville, during the American Civil War

References

Census-designated places in Fairfax County, Virginia
Washington metropolitan area
Census-designated places in Virginia